Simone Eduardo Assa Miranda (born 23 December 1999), better known as Lépua, is an Angolan professional footballer who plays as attacking midfielder for Sagrada Esperança and the Angola national team.

Professional career
Lépua is a youth product of Sagrada Esperança, and debuted with the senior team in 2018.

International career
Lépuadebuted with the Angola national team in a 1–0 2022 FIFA World Cup qualification loss to Egypt on 1 September 2021.

References

External links
 
 

1999 births
Living people
Angolan footballers
Angola international footballers
Association football midfielders
G.D. Sagrada Esperança players
Girabola players
Angola A' international footballers
2022 African Nations Championship players